WGXL (92.3 FM) is a radio station licensed to Hanover, New Hampshire, serving the Lebanon-Claremont, New Hampshire area.  The station is owned by Great Eastern Radio, LLC.  It airs a contemporary hit radio (Top 40/CHR) format.

History

The station went on the air as WTSL-FM on February 6, 1987.  On June 1, 1993, the station changed its call sign to the current WGXL.

On-air staff
The current on-air hosts are Kim Ashley (morning), Cindy Brooks (late morning to early afternoon), John Tesh (syndicated in the evening), and AT40 with Ryan Seacrest (Saturday mornings).

Former on-air staff
Former members of WGXL's staff include Stevens Blanchard, Pam Bixby, Dave Cooper, Deidre Tichner, Jim Patry, Rick Murphy, Jason Place, Bev Valentine, Dan Gilland, Shane Blue (now Jackson Blue on Boston's WXKS-FM), Chris Garrett, Doug McKenzie, Steve Smith, Parker Springfield (still on sister station WKKN) and Taylor Ford.  "Zach Sang And The Gang," a syndicated evening show, was also once heard on WGXL.

References

External links
WGXL website

GXL
Contemporary hit radio stations in the United States
Hanover, New Hampshire
Radio stations established in 1987
1987 establishments in New Hampshire